Sonotone may refer to:
 Sonotone (hearing aid)
 Sonotone, 2017 single by MC Solaar from his album Géopoétique